The Protar Affair is a 1956 Romanian comedy film directed by Haralambie Boros. It was entered into the 1956 Cannes Film Festival.

Cast
 Radu Beligan - Prof. Andronic
 Jenica Constantinescu
 Ion Fintesteanu
 Ion Iancovescu
 Ion Lucian
 Constantin Ramadan
 Ion Talianu
 Florin Vasiliu
 Ioana Zlotescu

References

External links

1956 films
Romanian comedy films
1950s Romanian-language films
1956 comedy films
Romanian black-and-white films